The Nissan NV (Nissan Van) is a full-size van produced by Nissan from 2011 to 2021. It was developed and marketed for the United States and Canada, where Nissan had not previously been present in the full-size segment. Until the introduction of the Nissan NV, Mexico was the only country in North America selling a full-size Nissan van, as the Nissan Urvan was sold there.

The NV nameplate was previously used by a small pickup truck sold in Thailand.

Development
The NV used the same F-Alpha platform as does the Nissan Titan full-size pickup, but due to the need for a flat loading floor it is highly modified and they end up sharing mainly powertrain pieces and some of the design language. The NV was also only available with rear-wheel drive, coupled to a five-speed automatic transmission (later also a seven-speed). The NV was not targeted directly at the (mainly fleet) buyers of the Ford E-Series and Chevrolet Express, but rather at private buyers including contractors and small business owners who are looking for a vehicle that is both capable and comfortable.

NV1500

It was only available with the 4-litre V6. It was available in S or SV trim, with the SV receiving power door locks, windows, outside mirrors, and 17" styled steel wheels.

NV2500
The NV2500 HD (HD for "heavy duty") was equipped with the 4-litre V6 engine, with the bigger V8 available as an option. It came in S, SV, or SL trim levels and was available in low or high roof; the SL was only available with the V8. The SV trim featured a lockable center console with power outlets as well as an additional 120 V outlet in the cargo compartment along with the features from the 1500 SV, while the SL trim added chrome bumpers, grille, and door handles and 17" chrome wheels.

NV3500
The NV3500 HD was the heaviest weight class offered, and was only available with the large 5.6-litre V8 engine with either a low or a high roof.

It was also the only weight class offered in passenger van configuration (with up to 12 seats). Unusually, the latter was offered either with a V6 or a V8, unlike its V8-only cargo counterpart. The NV3500 came in S, SV, or SL trim levels with no high roof available. The NV Passenger has a rollover risk of 30.6%.

Discontinuation
In 2020, Nissan reevaluated its commercial van business in North America, and decided to replace it with a "Business Advantage" program for its other vehicles. Production of the NV full-size vans ended in the middle of 2021, with sales continuing through the end of the year.

References
 

NV
2010s cars
Vans
Rear-wheel-drive vehicles
Vehicles introduced in 2011